Giacomo Balardi Arrigoni (died 12 September 1435) was a Roman Catholic prelate who served as Bishop of Urbino (1424–1435),
Bishop of Trieste (1418–1424),
and Bishop of Lodi (1407–1418).

Biography
Giacomo Balardi Arrigoni was ordained a priest in the Order of Preachers.
On 26 February 1407, he was appointed during the papacy of Pope Gregory XIII as Bishop of Lodi. 
On 10 January 1418, he was appointed during the papacy of Pope Martin V as Bishop of Trieste. 
On 11 December 1424, he was appointed during the papacy of Pope Martin V as Bishop of Urbino. 
He served as Bishop of Urbino until his death on 12 September 1435.

While bishop, he was the principal co-consecrator of Costanzo Fondulo, Bishop of Cremona (1412), and Girolamo de Pola, Bishop of Capodistria (1421).

References

External links and additional sources
 (for Chronology of Bishops) 
 (for Chronology of Bishops) 
 (for Chronology of Bishops) 
 (for Chronology of Bishops) 
 (for Chronology of Bishops) 
 (for Chronology of Bishops) 

15th-century Italian Roman Catholic bishops
Bishops appointed by Pope Gregory XII
Bishops appointed by Pope Martin V
1435 deaths
Dominican bishops